The 1987 Allan Cup was the Canadian senior ice hockey championship for the 1986–87 senior "AAA" season.  The event was hosted by the Brantford Motts Clamatos in Brantford, Ontario. The 1987 playoff marked the 79th time that the Allan Cup has been awarded.

Teams
Brantford Motts Clamatos (Eastern Canadian Champions)
Nelson Maple Leafs (Western Canadian Champions)

Best-of-Seven Series
Brantford Motts Clamatos 10 - Nelson Maple Leafs 5
Brantford Motts Clamatos 5 - Nelson Maple Leafs 1
Brantford Motts Clamatos 6 - Nelson Maple Leafs 3
Brantford Motts Clamatos 7 - Nelson Maple Leafs 6 (OT)

External links
Allan Cup archives 
Allan Cup website

Allan Cup
Sport in Brantford
Allan